Tilsley may refer to:

Colin Tilsley (1935–1981), the founder of Gospel Literature Outreach
Frank Tilsley (1904–1957), British novelist, broadcaster, and television dramatist from Manchester
Gwilym Tilsley (1911–1997), bardic name of "Tilsli", Welsh poet, Archdruid of the National Eisteddfod of Wales
Paul Tilsley, deputy leader of Birmingham City Council
Reg Tilsley (né Reginald Longueville Tilsley; 1926–1987) was a British composer

Fictional characters
Bert Tilsley, fictional character in the UK television ITV soap opera Coronation Street
Ivy Tilsley (also Brennan), fictional character in the UK television ITV soap opera Coronation Street; wife of Bert
Brian Tilsley, fictional character in the UK television ITV soap opera Coronation Street; son of Bert and Ivy
Gail Tilsley (also Potter, Platt, Hillman, McIntyre and Rodwell), fictional character in the UK television ITV soap opera Coronation Street; wife of Brian
Nick Tilsley, fictional character in the UK television ITV soap opera Coronation Street; son of Brian and Gail
Sarah-Louise Tilsley (later Platt), fictional character in the UK television ITV soap opera Coronation Street; daughter of Brian and Gail
Jack Tilsley, fictional character in the UK television ITV soap opera Coronation Street; appeared before Bert as Ivy's husband, but later retconned out of existence

See also
Tillsley